The ilama or ilama tree (Annona macroprophyllata) is a tropical fruit tree found in Central America. The name is derived from the Nahuatl ilamatzapotl, of which the rough translation is "old woman's sapote". The name is also applied to a similar fruit, soncoya or cabeza de negro  (Annona purpurea).

The ilama fruit is eaten halved, by scooping the flesh out of the rind, and usually chilled when served. It is sometimes served with cream and sugar to intensify the flavor, or with a drop of lime or lemon juice to highlight a tart and bitter note.

The ilama is probably the finest annonaceous fruit which can be grown in the tropical lowlands and the ilama may be termed the cherimoya of the lowlands.

Fruit

The ilama has a compound fruit, which is either cone-shaped, heart-shaped, or ovular. Generally, the ilama is covered with more-or-less pronounced, triangular lobules, though some fruits on the same tree may vary from bumpy to fairly smooth.

There are two types of ilama, green and pink. The green type has a flesh that is white and sweet, while the pink type has rosy-colored flesh with a tart taste.

The rind, or skin, of the ilama varies from a pale-green color to a deep-pink or purplish color, coated with a thick layer of velvety, gray-white bloom. It is about 1/4 inch thick (6 mm), leathery, fairly soft, with a grainy surface.

The flesh towards the fruit's center is somewhat fibrous, but smooth and custardy near the rind. Each seed is enclosed in a close-fitting membrane that, when split, allows the seed to slip out.

Tree
New growth is tinged a reddish or coppery color. The solitary flowers have three minutely hairy, long and narrow petals, maroon in color, with small, rusty, hairy sepals, and stamen-like, pollen-bearing inner petals.

Cultivation
Fruit harvest of the ilama tree occurs in late June in Mexico, and only lasts about two weeks. In Guatemala, the harvest season extends from late July to September, and from July to December where the ilama is cultivated in Florida.

According to tradition, the fruits are not to be picked until cracking occurs, but they can be picked a little earlier and held up to three days for softening to take place. If the ilama is picked too early, it will never ripen. The yield of the ilama is typically low. During the normal fruiting period, some trees will have no fruits; others only three to 10, while exceptional trees may bear as many as 85 to 100 fruits per season.

History
Francisco Hernandez was one of the first people to document the ilama. He was sent by King Philip II of Spain in 1570 to take note of the useful products of Mexico. For many years, people confused it with the soursop or the custard apple.

The ilama is native and grows wild in the foothills of the southwest coast of Mexico and of the Pacific coast of Guatemala and El Salvador. It is strictly a tropical plant. The ilama survives best in climates where there is a long dry season followed by plentiful rainfall. The tree is irrigated in areas where rainfall does not fall periodically.

Nutrition

According to analyses made in El Salvador, the food value per 100 g of edible portion of the fruit is as follows:

 Moisture, 71.5 g
 Protein, 0.447 g
 Fat, 0.16 g
 Fiber, 1.3 g
 Ash, 1.37 g
 Calcium, 31.6 mg
 Phosphorus, 51.7 mg
 Iron, 0.70 mg
 Carotene, 0.011 mg
 Thiamine, 0.235 mg
 Riboflavin, 0.297 mg
 Niacin, 2.177 mg
 Ascorbic Acid, 13.6 mg

Trivia

The ilama fruit was used as a plot device in the 1997 Malayalam film Guru, directed by Rajeev Anchal. This was India's official entry to the 1997 Academy Award, to be considered for nomination for the Best Foreign Film.

Unlike its portrayal in the film, eating ilama fruit does not cause blindness, nor does the seed cure one of blindness.

References
Davidson, Alan. Oxford Companion to Food (1999). "Ilama", pp. 395–396.

External links
 The Ilama - Purdue University
 Trade Winds Fruit Ilama Page 
 1998 CRFG Photo Contest Third Place: Genova Red Ilama 

Tropical fruit
Trees of El Salvador
Trees of Guatemala
Trees of Honduras
Trees of Mexico
Annona